Dyadobacter fermentans  is a Gram-negative bacterium from the genus of Dyadobacter which has been isolated from the stem of a Zea mays plant.

References

Further reading

External links
Type strain of Dyadobacter fermentans at BacDive -  the Bacterial Diversity Metadatabase	

Cytophagia
Bacteria described in 2000